Pum is a town in Kyrgyzstan.

Pum or PUM may also refer to:

 Mariateguist Unified Party (Spanish: Partido Unificado Mariateguista), a political party in Peru
Philipps University of Marburg in Marburg, Hesse, Germany
 Please Understand Me, acronym
Pomeranian Medical University in Szczecin in Szczecin, Poland
 Potentially Unwanted Modification (PUM), a classification of malware, for example PUM.bad.proxy
 Public utility model, an emergency medical service system
Puma language, by ISO 639-3 code

People
 Reinhold Pum, badminton player in the 1968 European Badminton Championships

See also
 Potentially unwanted program (PUP)